Orthotylus interpositus is a species of bug from the Miridae family that can be found in European countries such as Albania, Austria, Bulgaria, Czech Republic, France, Germany, Italy, Luxembourg, Poland, Romania, Slovakia, Slovenia, Spain, Switzerland, Ukraine, and southern part of Russia.

References

Insects described in 1938
Hemiptera of Europe
interpositus